Ascophora is an infraorder under order Cheilostomatida of the Bryozoa. 

They are now considered a synonym of Flustrina. 

Ascophorans are distinguished from other cheilostomes in having a completely calcified wall covering their frontal surface apart from the orifice, and possessing an ascus (hence the name of the suborder). The ascus is a water-filled sac of frontal membrane opening at or near the orifice.  It functions as a hydrostatic system by allowing water into the space below the inflexible frontal wall when the zooid everts its polypide (feeding tentacles) by muscles pulling the frontal membrane inwards (non-ascophorans do not need this structure as their frontal wall is not calcified).

The structure of this frontal wall is the basis of distinguishing the four major subdivisions of the Ascophora, each of which is, however, currently under suspicion of being polyphyletic and/or paraphyletic. They are therefore listed here as 'unranked' groupings.

Ascophorans are exclusively marine, but very widespread geographically and ecologically. They grow on various substrates and in a variety of colony shapes.

Classification 

Suborder Ascophora
Section Acanthostegomorpha
Superfamily Cribrilinoidea
Family Cribrilinidae
Family †Lekythoglenidae
Family Euthyroididae
Family Polliciporidae
Superfamily Bifaxarioidea
Family Bifaxariidae
Family †Platyglenidae
Family Mixtopeltidae
Superfamily †Scorioporoidea
Family †Scorioporidae
Family †Nephroporidae
Superfamily Catenicelloidea
Family Catenicellidae
Family †Concatenellidae
Family Eurystomellidae
Family Savignyellidae
Family Petalostegidae
Section Hippothoomorpha
Superfamily Hippothooidea
Family Hippothoidae
Family Chorizoporidae
Family Trypostegidae
Family Pasytheidae
Superfamily †Dysnoetoporoidea
Family †Dysnoetoporidae
Section Umbonulomorpha
Superfamily Arachnopusioidea
Family Arachnopusiidae
Family Exechonellidae
Superfamily Adeonoidea
Family Adeonidae
Family Adeonellidae
Family Inversiulidae
Superfamily Pseudolepralioidea
Family Pseudolepraliidae
Superfamily Lepralielloidea
Family Dhondtiscidae
Family Bryocryptellidae
Family Romancheinidae
Family †Sfeniellidae
Family Umbonulidae
Family Tessaradomidae
Family Hincksiporidae
Family Sclerodomidae
Family Metrarabdotosidae
Superfamily Chlidoniopsoidea
Family Chlidoniopsidae
Section Lepraliomorpha
Superfamily Smittinoidea
Family Smittinidae
Family Bitectiporidae
Family Watersiporidae
Superfamily Schizoporelloidea
Family Schizoporellidae
Family Stomachetosellidae
Family Tetraplariidae
Family †Bryobaculidae
Family Phorioppniidae
Family Porinidae
Family Margarettidae
Family Myriaporidae
Family Hippopodinidae
Family Pacificincolidae
Family Hippaliosinidae
Family †Duvergieriidae
Family Gigantoporidae
Family Lanceoporidae
Family Cheiloporinidae
Family Cryptosulidae
Family Actisecidae
Family Teuchoporidae
Family Echinovadomidae
Family Phoceanidae
Family Mawatariidae
Family Vicidae
Family †Cheilhorneropsidae
Family Microporellidae
Family Calwelliidae
Family Petraliidae
Family Petraliellidae
Family Cyclicoporidae
Family Lacernidae
Family Escharinidae
Family Acoraniidae
Family Buffonellodidae
Family Jaculinidae
Family Eminooeciidae
Family Fenestrulinidae
Superfamily Urceoliporoidea
Family Urceoliporidae
Family †Prostomariidae
Superfamily Didymoselloidea
Family Didymosellidae
Superfamily Euthyriselloidea
Family Euthyrisellidae
Superfamily Siphonicytaroidea
Family Siphonicytaridae
Superfamily Mamilloporoidea
Family Mamilloporidae
Family Crepidacanthidae
Family Cleidochasmatidae
Family Ascosiidae
Superfamily Celleporoidea
Family Celleporidae
Family Torquatellidae
Family Hippoporidridae
Family Phidoloporidae
Superfamily Conescharellinoidea
Family Conescharellinidae
Family Batoporidae
Family Lekythoporidae
Family Orbituliporidae
Family †Cuvillieridae

References

Protostome infraorders
Cheilostomatida